Guillaume Dubois or Guillaume Crétin (c. 1460 – 30 November 1525) was a French poet who is considered to belong to the school of the Grands Rhétoriqueurs ("rhetoricians").

Life
He was treasurer of the Sainte-Chapelle de Vincennes, then cantor of the Sainte-Chapelle de Paris and ordinary almoner to Francis I of France.

Of his work, mainly his 'chants royaux' (1527), praised by his contemporaries, survive. He was recognised as a master, notably by Jean Lemaire de Belges and Clément Marot. He is one of the great virtuosos of 'rime équivoquée' (for example, the Espistre à Honorat de la Jaille of circa 1510).

References

External links
 Two poems

1460 births
1525 deaths
16th-century French poets
French poets
French male poets